Lloque Yupanqui (born c. January 1, 1260 – died c. January 1, 1290, aged approximately circa 30) (Quechua Lluq'i Yupanki "the glorified lefthander") was the third Sapa Inca of the Kingdom of Cuzco (beginning around CE 1260) and a member of the Hurin dynasty.

Family and personality
He was the son and successor of Sinchi Roca, though he had an elder brother Manco Sapaca. He was the father of Mayta Cápac. His wife's name is variously given as Mama Cava, also known as Mama Cahua (Quechua Mama Qawa) or Mama Cora Ocllo.

The mother of this king was queen Mama Cura.

Reign
Although some chronicles attributed minor conquests to him, others say that he did not wage any wars, or that he was even occupied with rebellions.

Market
He is said to have established the public market in Cuzco and built the Acllahuasi. In the days of the Inca Empire, this institution gathered young women from across the empire; some were given by the Inca as concubines to nobles and warriors and others were dedicated to the cult of the Sun god. Sometimes they were simply servants.

References 

Inca emperors
13th-century monarchs in South America